There are 1,646 communes (khums/sangkats) in Cambodia.  Each Commune Council is composed of 5 to 11 members depending on demography and geography, elected through a proportional system where nationally registered political parties can compete by presenting a list of candidates of at least twice the number of seats in each Commune.  There are no independent candidates. Commune councillors vote on their constituents' behalf in Senate elections. As such, a victory in communal elections would all but guarantee a majority in the Senate.

There are currently 11,572 councillors from 1,646 communes.

Related external links

 Official Results of the 2007 Commune Councils Election
 National Election Committee
 2007 COMMUNE COUNCIL ELECTION CALENDAR (PDF)
 Promoting Women's Participation In Decision Making At the commune level in Cambodia - by the World Bank (PDF)

Politics of Cambodia